The 1915-16 season in Swedish football, starting August 1915 and ending July 1916:

Honours

Official titles

Competitions

Promotions, relegations and qualifications

Promotions

League transfers

Relegations

Domestic results

Svenska Serien 1915–16

Uppsvenska Serien 1915–16

Mellansvenska Serien 1915–16

Västsvenska Serien 1916

Svenska Mästerskapet 1915 
Final

Kamratmästerskapen 1915 
Final

Wicanderska Välgörenhetsskölden 1915 
Final

National team results 

 Sweden: 

 Sweden: 

 Sweden: 

 Sweden:

National team players in season 1915/16

Notes

References 
Print

Online

 
Seasons in Swedish football